Perifovea is a region in the retina that circumscribes the parafovea and fovea and is a part of the macula lutea. The perifovea is a belt that covers a 10° radius around the fovea and is 1.5 mm wide. The perifovea ends when the Henle's fiber layer disappears and the ganglion cells are one-layered.

Additional images

See also
 Eye movements in reading
 Fixation (visual)
 Optical coherence tomography (OCT)

References

Human eye anatomy
Visual perception